{{Speciesbox
| status = DD
| status_system = IUCN3.1
| status_ref = <ref name = IUCN>{{Cite journal | author = Singh, L. | year = 2010 | title = Psilorhynchus rahmani' | journal = The IUCN Red List of Threatened Species | volume = 2010 | page = e.T168539A6510875}} Downloaded on 28 January 2018.</ref>
| taxon = Psilorhynchus rahmani
| authority = Conway & Mayden, 2008
}}Psilorhynchus rahmani'' is a freshwater ray-finned fish a torrent minnow which is found in a small, well oxygenated hill stream near Chittagong University in Hathazari Upazila in the Chittagong Division of Bangladesh. The specific name honours A. K. Ataur Rahman of the Department of Fisheries in Dhaka, for his contribution to the ichthyology of Bangladesh.

References 

rahmani
Fish of Bangladesh
Taxa named by Kevin W. Conway
Taxa named by Richard L. Mayden
Fish described in 2008